Ssangnyuk (hangul: 쌍륙, hanja: 雙六) is a traditional Korean board game.

Introduction

Ssangnyuk (or Ssang-yuk) is a game using dice that is most commonly played in winter. It has a game board, 30 horses and 2 dice. It is also called ssangnyuk (same spelling and sound but different hanja: 雙陸), aksak (hangul: 악삭, hanja: 握槊), sangnyuk (상륙, 象陸), and ssang-yuk (상육, 象陸).

The game is similar in structure and play to those of the Tables family of games, a genre that includes Backgammon.

Contents

The game board doesn't have any required size, but on average it is 80 cm long and 40 cm wide. A die is about 1 cm³ and is made from ivory or bone. Tiger bone is preferred.

See also
Backgammon
ban-sugoroku (盤双六) (a Japanese variant of backgammon)

References

http://dbplus.naver.com/dbplus.naver?where=custom&pkgid=201007140&query=%EC%A0%84%ED%86%B5%EB%86%80%EC%9D%B4&id=000000049669

Korean games
Tables games